The 2006 Dakar Rally, also known as the 2006 Paris-Dakar Rally, was the 28th running of the Dakar Rally event. The 2006 event ran from 31 December 2005 to 15 January 2006. It started from Lisbon, Portugal, and passed through Spain, Morocco, Mali, Mauritania, Guinea, before finishing in Senegal. The format included speed restrictions on motorcycles and trucks and reduced use of global positioning systems. Competitors included double world rally champion, Carlos Sainz.

Entries

Bikes

Notes

Cars

Trucks

Stages

Notes:
 — Stage cancelled for bikes only in tribute to Andy Caldecott, who died during the previous stage.

Motorcycles 
Australian motorcyclist Andy Caldecott died in an accident during ninth stage. The tenth stage was not timed as a mark of respect for Caldecott. Spanish rider Marc Coma on KTM won the motorcycle category, second was French rider Cyril Despres and third Italian rider Giovanni Sala (both on KTM).

Notes:
 — Ruben Faria was awarded a 12-minute penalty for failing to complete the opening stage (including liaison) within the time limit, denying him the lead of the overall classification.

Cars 
Sainz riding VW Race Touareg won the first stage from Lisbon to Portimão, and also the second stage. Jean-Louis Schlesser, winner of the event in 1999 and 2000, riding Schlesser-Ford Buggy, won the third stage between Nador to Er Rachidia in Morocco, with Nani Roma on Mitsubishi Pajero Evo taking the overall lead. Sainz won the fourth stage and took the overall lead. Stephane Peterhansel, winner in 2004 and 2005, won the fifth stage while Sainz held on to the overall lead. Giniel de Villiers moved into the lead, 22 seconds ahead of Sainz, after the sixth stage from Tan Tan to Zouerat, which was won by Thierry Magnaldi. 
Stephane Peterhansel won the seventh stage between Zouerat and Atar in Mauritania but Luc Alphand, who took second place, moved into the overall lead. Stephane Peterhansel moved into the lead after finishing third in the eighth stage, which was won by Thierry Magnaldi.

Peterhansel won the ninth stage between Nouakchott and Kiffa in Mauritania to extend his lead; however, his win was overshadowed by the death of Australian motorcyclist Andy Caldecott in an accident. The tenth stage was won by Sainz with overall leader Stephane Peterhansel third.  Peterhansel's overall lead was reduced after he finished 11th in the eleventh stage behind winner Giniel de Villiers. Peterhansel lost time after hitting a tree during a duststorm in the twelfth stage, which was won by Luc Alphand who took the overall lead. Alphand also won the thirteenth stage between Guinea and Senegal, which was marred by the death of a 10-year-old boy who was hit by a car as he crossed the road. He retained the overall lead after the fourteenth stage, which was won by Guerlain Chicherit; a second child was killed after reportedly being hit by a support lorry. The final stage was not timed as a mark of respect for the three deaths. The rally was won by Luc Alphand.

Trucks 
Vladimir Chagin riding Kamaz won the truck category, second was Hans Stacey on MAN, and third was Firdaus Kabirov on Kamaz.

Final standings

Motorcycles

Cars

Trucks

In media
A motorcycle team organized by English actor Charley Boorman competed in the rally. Boorman was injured and fellow team member Matt Hall dropped out, but Simon Pavey finished in 86th place. Their experience was documented in the 2006 television miniseries Race to Dakar and an accompanying book.

References

Dakar Rally
D
Dakar Rally, 2006
2006 in French motorsport